Chief Bernard Ominayak was born in 1950 at Lubicon Lake and is the Chief  of the Lubicon Lake Indian Nation, Alberta, Canada.

References

External links 
Chief Ominayak, "This Is Where We're From"

1950 births
Indigenous leaders in Alberta
Living people
Cree people